Xylophis is a small genus of snakes in the family Pareidae. The genus contains five species, all of which are endemic to the Western Ghats in southern India. They constitute the monotypic subfamily Xylophiinae. They are the only pareid snakes found in India and the only snakes in the family found outside Southeast Asia.

Species
The following 5 species are recognized as being valid
Xylophis captaini  — Captain's wood snake, Captain's xylophis
Xylophis deepaki Narayanan, Mohapatra, Balan, Das, & Gower, 2021 — Deepak's wood snake
Xylophis mosaicus  — Anamalai wood snake
Xylophis perroteti  — Perrotet's mountain snake, striped narrow-headed snake
Xylophis stenorhynchus  — Günther's mountain snake

References

Further reading
Beddome RH (1878). "Description of a new genus of snakes of the family Calamaridæ, from Southern India". Proceedings of the Zoological Society of London 1878: 156. (Xylophis, new genus).

Pareidae
Snake genera
Snakes of Asia
Reptiles of India
Endemic fauna of the Western Ghats
Taxa named by Richard Henry Beddome